Sasu Antreas Salin (born June 11, 1991) is a Finnish professional basketball player for Iberostar Tenerife of the Liga ACB. Standing at 1.91 m (6 ft 3 in) he plays the point guard and shooting guard positions.

Professional career
On August 27, 2010, Salin signed a three-year contract with the Slovenian club Union Olimpija. On June 20, 2013, he extended his contract with Olimpija for two more seasons. In February 2015, he left Olimpija and signed with Spanish team Herbalife Gran Canaria for the rest of the season. On June 16, 2015, he re-signed with Gran Canaria for one more season.

On July 11, 2017, Salin signed a two-year deal with Spanish club Unicaja. On July 12, 2019, Salin signed a two-year deal with Spanish club Iberostar Tenerife.

References

External links

Sasu Salin at acb.com
Sasu Salin at eurobasket.com
Sasu Salin at euroleague.net
Sasu Salin at fiba.com

1991 births
Living people
2014 FIBA Basketball World Cup players
ABA League players
Baloncesto Málaga players
CB Canarias players
CB Gran Canaria players
Espoon Honka players
Finnish expatriate basketball people in Spain
Finnish men's basketball players
KK Olimpija players
Liga ACB players
Point guards
Sportspeople from Helsinki